Mount Pleasant Cemetery may refer to:

in Canada
Mount Pleasant Cemetery, Toronto, Ontario
Mount Pleasant Cemetery, Melfort, Saskatchewan

in the United States
Mt. Pleasant Cemetery (Pine Rock, Illinois), one of Ogle County's cemeteries
Mount Pleasant Cemetery (Bangor, Maine), Bangor, Maine
Mount Pleasant Cemetery (Taunton, Massachusetts), listed on the National Register of Historic Places (NRHP)
Mount Pleasant Cemetery (Newark, New Jersey), NRHP-listed
Mount Pleasant Cemetery, Hawthorne, Westchester County, New York
Mount Pleasant Cemetery (Sioux Falls, South Dakota), location of NRHP-listed Josephine Martin Glidden Memorial Chapel
Mount Pleasant Cemetery, Seattle, Washington